Michael Tarbi (born 1980 in Pittsburgh, Pennsylvania) is an American artist.

Biography 
Michael Tarbi's work was first exhibited at the Corcoran Gallery of Art in 1998 where he received the national "American Visions Award" for his work entitled, "Small Portraits".  This work went on to be exhibited at the President's Office of Arts and Humanities.

Tarbi studied at the Pennsylvania Academy of the Fine Arts, Philadelphia from 1998 to 2002.  There he received numerous awards including "the Angelo Pinto Prize for Experimental Work" and "the Henry J. Schiet Travel Scholarship".

Since 2002, Tarbi's work has appeared in galleries and museums nationwide including the Institute of Contemporary Art in Philadelphia and the White Box - Annex Gallery in New York.  In 2006 he was presented with the Irene Palenski Memorial Award at the Carnegie Museum of Art.  His first major one person exhibition followed at Thomas Robertello Gallery, Chicago in 2006.

External links 
Thomas Robertello gallery
 Post Gazette
Time Out
Art Facts
New City Review 
Saatchi Online

References 

Living people
20th-century American painters
American male painters
21st-century American painters
21st-century American male artists
1980 births
20th-century American male artists